Tony Ricciardello, (born 19 March 1979), is a multiple-championship winning Australian race car driver.

Son of Sports Sedan racer and team owner Basil Ricciardello, Tony was brought up into the Western Australian racing scene. He eventually replaced Brian Smith as the driver of the Ricciardello Racing, Chevrolet V8 powered, space-frame constructed, Alfa Romeo Alfetta GTV bodied Sports Sedan in the national series. Ricciardello has won the national series seven times, the all-time record for the category, and has finished inside the top three positions in each of the thirteen series which he contested. Ricciardello is one of just two drivers to win a title seven times in the same class of Australian bitumen-surface circuit racing.

Ricciardello has also raced in the V8 Supercar category. He contested a number of races with Britek Motorsport in the 2006 V8 Supercar Championship Series and has spent several seasons as a co-driver in the two annual two-driver endurance races. In 2010 Ricciardello contested his first full season in V8 Supercars, driving the #16 Holden Commodore (VE) for Kelly Racing in the Championship. The relationship did not continue into 2011 and Ricciardello returned to the Sports Sedans category, winning the 2011 Kerrick Sports Sedan Series.

Career results

Complete Bathurst 1000 results

References 

 VESRIX Driver stats
 Driver Database stats

1979 births
Living people
Racing drivers from Perth, Western Australia
Supercars Championship drivers
Kelly Racing drivers
Dick Johnson Racing drivers